Lake Toma in the Swiss canton of Graubünden is generally regarded as the Source of the Rhine. Its outflow is called Rein da Tuma and after a few kilometers, it forms the Vorderrhein/Rein Anteriur. The course of this river is not particularly representative: after about two kilometers, its water is diverted into Curnera reservoir. The water is released at the Tavanase plant and flows into the Rhine at Ilanz. The river begins to be called Rhine in the vicinity of Chur, more specifically, at the confluence of the Vorderrhein and Hinterrhein/Rein Posteriur next to Reichenau in Tamins.

Criteria for distinguishing between main branches and tributaries 
There are different criteria for the definition of tributaries, and by some definitions, irrespective of the official name, one strand or another may be called the source. Determining the source of the Rhine is difficult, because in the river system of the Anterior and Posterior Rhine, there are many headwaters of similar size. Apart from the common criterion of the (apparent or real) larger discharge, ongoing cartographic research allows us to determine the headwater with the greatest length, the largest catchment area or (occasionally) the highest source.

The direction of flow may be crucial to the nomenclature as may be the significance of the valleys as room for housing and transport. Both criteria are more appropriate to the Vorderrhein, since the Hinterrhein valley was hardly populated before the influx of the Walser.

Rhine sources by name 

The Swiss Federal Office of Topography and ETH Zürich indicate a point north of Lake Toma and the Rein da Tuma as the source of the Rhine (and also of the Vorderrhein), and as the source of the Hinterrhein a point in the upper valley of the Rheinwald, east of the Rheinwaldhorn.

In the area of the headwaters of the Rhine, the term Rhine is used as part of the name of many rivers, in many different spellings, such as Rhine, Rein, Rain, Ragn, Ren, Reno and Rin.

Source of the Rhine according to maximum discharge 

If one were to use largest discharge as one's criterion for deciding which flow should be called Rhine, one need not look at eastern Switzerland at all, since the Aare has a larger discharge than the Rhine at the confluence. However, in the rest of this article, the Aare will be ignored.

The source of the main flow path can be obtained by following the river upstream and determining at each junction which the larger river. At the confluence of the Vorderrhein and Hinterrhein (forming the Rhine) at Reichenau, the average of the Vorderrhein is 53.8 m³/s and the discharge of the Hinterrhein is somewhat larger at 59.6 m³/s. At the mouth of the Albula, in the natural state, the latter is larger than the Hinterrhein (29.1 m³/s for the Albula compared with 27.3 m³/s for the Hinterrhein). At the mouth of the Landwasser, the latter is significantly larger (9.45 m³/s compared to 5.57 m³/s). Among the headwaters of the Landwasser in the Davos area, the Dischmabach is slightly larger than the Flüelabach, even if considering the former small tributary flowing out of Lake Davos. This implies that the hydrological main branch starts at the top of the Dischma, far away from greater rivers bearing the name "Rhine".

The current values of the average discharge are rather different from the natural values, because many hydropower plants draw water from outside their natural catchment and this water bypasses some gauging stations. Water is retrieved from southern parts of the Vorderrhein watershed and released into the Hinterrhein, or taken from the Hinterrhein and released into the Albula, or taken from the Landwasser and Albula and released into the lower Hinterrhein (e.g. Albula-Landwasser Hydropower). In the upper Landwasser Valley, water is retrieved from the Flüelabach and Davosersee and released in a neighbouring valley near Aeua in the Klosters area.

Source of the Rhine by length 
Near the "source of the Rhine" at Lake Toma, there is a well-known sign with the erroneous information, "1320 km to the mouth"; it is only about 1230 km. The number of 1320 km is widespread. It is unclear whether it refers to the river length as measured from Lake Toma. It may be the result of transposing digits.

The flow path from the source in Lake Toma through Rein da Tuma measures about 71 km to the confluence of the Vorderrhein and Hinterrhein. From there it is more about 1160 km downriver to the North Sea. There are, however, some longer flow paths in the Vorderrhein area. Measuring the longest path from the source to the confluence at Reichenau:

 About 76 km: Rein da Medel (the central part is also known as Froda; the headwaters in Ticino are known as Reno di Medel)
 About 75 km: Rein da Maighels (a tributary of the Rein da Curnera)
 About 74 km: Rein da Curnera
 About 71 km: Rein da Tuma (counting Lake Toma and the longest stream into the lake)
 About 71 km: Rein da Nalps
 About 70 km: two unnamed streams descending from the Puozas and Milez areas close to the Oberalp Pass
 About 70 km: the Aua da Val, descending from the valley Val, which disappears under a moraine at an altitude of 2367 m and reappears on a ledge some distance lower
 About 69.5 km: Aua da Urlaun, a tributary of the Rein da Tuma

The flow paths in the Hinterrheins tend to be slightly shorter:

 About 72 km: Dischmabach
 About 70 km: Flüelabach
 About 64 km: Hinterrhein
 About 64 km: Totalpbach (a former headwater of the Landwasser; now flows into Lake Davos and from there the water is artificially piped to Klosters)
 About 63 km: Gelgia
 About 61 km: Madrischer Rhein
 About 56 km: The Ava da Ravais, headwater of the Albula flows east from Bergün
 About 53 km: a headwater of the Albula descending from the Crap Alv Laiets near the Albula Pass

The longest headwater of both the Vorderrhein and the Rhine as a whole, therefore, is the Reno di Medel, rising about 7.5 km south of Lake Toma. Its spring and upper reaches are located west of the Lukmanier Pass in the municipality of Quinto in Ticino.

Size of the catchment areas 
The catchment area of the Vorderrhein covers about 1512 km²; the basin of the Hinterrhein (including the Albula and Landwasser), is slightly larger at 1693 km². The percentage of precipitation flowing down the river is fairly similar in the valleys of the headwaters of the Rhine, so the size of the catchment area tends to be proportional to the average discharge, and therefore this criterion does not need to be considered separately.

Summary 

No clear hierarchy can be established among the headwaters of the Rhine. The two main systems, the Vorderrhein in the west and the Hinterrhein in the south and east, differ only slightly in length, discharge and size of their catchment areas.

The longest paths begin in the upper Surselva (valley of the Rein Anteriur) and the upper Landwasser Valley, respectively the most western and the most eastern parts of the headwaters area. The source of the hydrological main path would be found in the east, in the Dischma (valley of the Dischmabach).

Footnotes 

Rhine
Geography of Graubünden
Rivers of Switzerland